Protection against Accidents (Dockers) Convention (Revised), 1932 is  an International Labour Organization Convention.

It was established in 1932:
Having decided upon the adoption of certain proposals with regard to the partial revision of the Convention concerning the protection against accidents of workers employed in loading or unloading ships adopted by the Conference at its Twelfth Session,...

Modification 
This Convention is a partial revision of Convention C28 - Protection against Accidents (Dockers) Convention, 1929 (shelved). It was subsequently revised in 1979 by Convention C152 - Occupational Safety and Health (Dock Work) Convention, 1979.

Ratifications
As of 2013, the convention has been ratified by 46 states. Of the ratifying states, 13 have denounced the treaty, many automatically due to the ratification of Convention C152.

External links 
Text.
Ratifications.

Health treaties
International Labour Organization conventions
Occupational safety and health treaties
Treaties concluded in 1932
Treaties entered into force in 1934
Treaties of Algeria
Treaties of Argentina
Treaties of Azerbaijan
Treaties of Bangladesh
Treaties of the Byelorussian Soviet Socialist Republic
Treaties of Belgium
Treaties of Bosnia and Herzegovina
Treaties of the People's Republic of Bulgaria
Treaties of Canada
Treaties of Chile
Treaties of the Republic of China (1912–1949)
Treaties of Croatia
Treaties of Honduras
Treaties of British India
Treaties of Ireland
Treaties of Kenya
Treaties of Kyrgyzstan
Treaties of Malta
Treaties of Mauritius
Treaties of Montenegro
Treaties of New Zealand
Treaties of Nigeria
Treaties of Panama
Treaties of Serbia and Montenegro
Treaties of Yugoslavia
Treaties of Sierra Leone
Treaties of Singapore
Treaties of Slovenia
Treaties of Tajikistan
Treaties of North Macedonia
Treaties of the Ukrainian Soviet Socialist Republic
Treaties of the United Kingdom
Treaties of Uruguay
Admiralty law treaties
1932 in labor relations